Ferroxyl indicator is a solution containing potassium hexacyanoferrate(III) and phenolphthalein. It turns blue in the presence of Fe2+ ions, and pink in the presence of hydroxide ions. It can be used to detect metal oxidation, and is often used to detect rusting in various situations.

It can be prepared by dissolving 10g sodium chloride and 1g potassium hexacyanoferrate(III) in distilled water, adding 10 cm3 phenolphthalein indicator, then making up to 500 cm3 with distilled water.

References

Chemical tests
Corrosion